Vesle Meinickeøya is the smaller of the two islands that comprise Meinickeøyane, part of Thousand Islands, an island group south of Edgeøya.

References

 Norwegian Polar Institute Place Names of Svalbard Database

Islands of Svalbard